Ronald George Payne (22 October 1925 – 9 April 2015) was an Australian politician who represented the South Australian House of Assembly seat of Mitchell for the Labor Party from 1970 to 1989.

References

Members of the South Australian House of Assembly
1925 births
2015 deaths
Australian Labor Party members of the Parliament of South Australia